Ted North Jr. (born Edward Ernest Steinel) (November 3, 1916 – November 22, 1975) was an American film actor of the 1940s, sometimes credited as Michael North.

The son of tent show operator Ted North, he was born in Topeka, Kansas, and graduated from the University of Kansas in 1939.

North gained early acting experience in some of his father's stock theater productions. He appeared in several films including the films noir The Unsuspected and The Devil Thumbs a Ride (both 1947).

North was married to actress Mary Beth Hughes from 1943 until their divorce in 1947. They had two sons. He married again in 1952.

After North left acting, he became an agent for entertainers, including Red Skelton, Milburn Stone, and Amanda Blake.

North died in Florida, aged 59.

Filmography

References

External links

1916 births
1975 deaths
American male film actors
20th-century American male actors